Mitchell Herbert Ellis (August 4, 1921 – March 28, 2010) was an American jazz guitarist. During the 1950s, he was in a trio with pianist Oscar Peterson.

Biography
Born in Farmersville, Texas, and raised in the suburbs of Dallas, Ellis first heard the electric guitar performed by George Barnes on a radio program. This experience is said to have inspired him to take up the guitar. He became proficient on the instrument by the time he entered North Texas State University. Ellis majored in music, but because they did not yet have a guitar program at that time, he studied the string bass. Unfortunately, due to lack of funds, his college days were short-lived. In 1941, Ellis dropped out of college and toured for six months with a band from the University of Kansas.

In 1943, he joined Glen Gray and the Casa Loma Orchestra, and it was with Gray's band that he got his first recognition in the jazz magazines. After Gray's band, Ellis joined the Jimmy Dorsey band where he played some of his first recorded solos. Ellis remained with Dorsey through 1947, traveling and recording extensively, and playing in dance halls and movie palaces. Then came a turnabout that would change Ellis's career forever. As pianist Lou Carter told journalist Robert Dupuis in a 1996 interview, "The Dorsey band had a six-week hole in the schedule. The three of us had played together some with the big band. John Frigo, who had already left the band, knew the owner of the Peter Stuyvesant Hotel in Buffalo. We went in there and stayed six months. And that's how the group the Soft Winds were born". Together with Frigo and Lou Carter, Ellis wrote the classic jazz standards "Detour Ahead" and "I Told Ya I Love Ya, Now Get Out".

The Soft Winds group was fashioned after the Nat King Cole Trio. They stayed together until 1952. Ellis then joined the Oscar Peterson Trio (replacing Barney Kessel) in 1953, forming what Scott Yanow would later on refer to as "one of the most memorable of all the piano, guitar, and bass trios in jazz history".

Ellis became prominent after performing with the Oscar Peterson Trio from 1953 to 1958, along with pianist Peterson and bassist Ray Brown. He was a somewhat controversial member of the trio, because he was the only white person in the group in a time when racism was still very much widespread.

In addition to their live and recorded work as the Oscar Peterson Trio, this unit usually with the addition of a drummer, served as the virtual "house rhythm section" for Norman Granz's Verve Records, supporting the likes of tenormen Ben Webster and Stan Getz, as well as trumpeters Dizzy Gillespie, Roy Eldridge, and Sweets Edison and other jazz stalwarts. Ellis was part of the rhythm section but did not solo on every track. With drummer Buddy Rich, they were also the backing band for popular "comeback" albums by the duet of Ella Fitzgerald and Louis Armstrong.

The trio were one of the mainstays of Granz's Jazz at the Philharmonic concerts as they swept the jazz world, almost constantly touring the United States and Europe. Ellis left the Peterson Trio in November 1958, to be replaced not by a guitarist, but by drummer Ed Thigpen. The years of 1957 through 1960 found Ellis touring with Ella Fitzgerald.  In addition, Ellis was a mainstay in Hollywood recording studios playing on various types of sessions.  Eventually, he left studio work to concentrate on his jazz career, both onstage and on records.

The three provided a stirring rendition of "Tenderly" as a jazz improvisational backdrop to John Hubley's 1958 cartoon The Tender Game.

With fellow jazz guitarists Barney Kessel, Charlie Byrd and later, Tal Farlow, he created another ensemble, the Great Guitars.

Herb Ellis was also featured on an episode of Sanford and Son accompanying Fred Sanford's singing.

Ellis gave cartoonist and The Far Side creator Gary Larson guitar lessons, in exchange for the cover illustration for the album, Doggin' Around (Concord, 1988) by Ellis and bassist Red Mitchell.

In 1994, he joined the Arkansas Jazz Hall of Fame. On November 15, 1997, he received an Honorary Doctorate from the University of North Texas College of Music.

Ellis died of Alzheimer's disease at his Los Angeles home on the morning of March 28, 2010, at the age of 88.

Discography

As leader
 Ellis in Wonderland (Norgran, 1956)
 Nothing but the Blues (Verve, 1957)
 Herb Ellis Meets Jimmy Giuffre (Verve, 1959)
 Softly...but with That Feeling (Verve, 1961)
 Three Guitars in Bossa Nova Time (Epic, 1963)
 Together! with Stuff Smith (Epic, 1963)
 4 to Go! with Andre Previn (Columbia, 1963)
 Guitar/Guitar with Charlie Byrd (Columbia, 1965)
 Man with the Guitar (Dot, 1965)
 Herb Ellis and the All Stars (Epic, 1974)
 Herb Ellis & Ray Brown's Soft Shoe (Concord Jazz, 1974)
 Seven, Come Eleven with Joe Pass (Concord Jazz, 1974)
 Jazz/Concord with Joe Pass (Concord Jazz, 1974)
 Two for the Road with Joe Pass (Pablo, 1974)
 Rhythm Willie with Freddie Green (Concord Jazz, 1975)
 In Session with Herb Ellis (Guitar Player, 1975)
 After You've Gone with Ray Brown, Harry "Sweets" Edison (Concord Jazz, 1975)
 Great Guitars with Charlie Byrd, Barney Kessel (Concord Jazz, 1976)
 A Pair to Draw To with Ross Tompkins (Concord Jazz, 1976)
 Poor Butterfly with Barney Kessel (Concord Jazz, 1977)
 Herb (CBS/Sony, 1978)
 Great Guitars: Straight Tracks with Charlie Byrd, Barney Kessel (Concord Jazz, 1978)
 Windflower with Remo Palmier (Concord Jazz, 1978)
 Soft & Mellow (Concord Jazz, 1979)
 Great Guitars at the Winery with Charlie Byrd, Barney Kessel (Concord Jazz, 1980)
 At Montreux Summer 1979 (Concord Jazz, 1980)
 Interplay with Cal Collins Concord Jazz, 1981)
 Great Guitars at Charlie's Georgetown with Charlie Byrd, Barney Kessel (Concord Jazz, 1983)
 Anniversary in Paris with Marc Hemmeler (Phoenix, 1986)
 Doggin' Around with Red Mitchell (Concord Jazz, 1989)
 Roll Call (Justice, 1991)
 Memories of You: A Tribute to Benny Goodman with Terry Gibbs, Buddy DeFranco (Contemporary, 1991)
 Texas Swings (Justice, 1992)
 The Jazz Masters with Ray Brown, Serge Ermoll, (AIM, 1994)
 The Return of the Great Guitars with Charlie Byrd, Mundell Lowe, Larry Coryell (Concord Jazz, 1996)
 Down-Home (Justice, 1996)
 Herb Ellis Meets T. C. Pfeiler (Tonewheel, 1997)
 Burnin'  (Acoustic Music, 1998)
 An Evening with Herb Ellis (Jazz Focus, 1998)
 Blues Variations (Live at EJ's, 1998)
 Conversations in Swing Guitar with Duke Robillard (Stony Plain, 1999)
 Great Guitars Live with Charlie Byrd, Barney Kessel (Concord 2001)
 More Conversations in Swing Guitar with Duke Robillard (Stony Plain, 2003)

With Monty Alexander and Ray Brown
 Trio (Concord Jazz, 1981)
 Triple Treat (Concord Jazz, 1982)
 Overseas Special (Concord Jazz, 1984)
 Triple Treat II (Concord Jazz, 1988)
 Triple Treat III (Concord Jazz, 1989)

With Oscar Peterson
 Hello Herbie (MPS, 1970)
 Jazz at the Philharmonic Blues in Chicago 1955 (Verve, 1983)
 The Legendary Oscar Peterson Trio Live at the Blue Note (Telarc, 1990)
 A Tribute to Oscar Peterson Live at The Town Hall (Telarc, 1997)
 Tenderly (Just a Memory 2002)
 Vancouver 1958 (Just a Memory, 2003)

As sideman
With Mel Brown
Chicken Fat (Impulse!, 1967)

With Benny Carter
Benny Carter Plays Pretty (Norgran, 1954)
New Jazz Sounds (Norgran, 1954)

With Priscilla Coolidge
Gypsy Queen (Sussex, 1970)

With Harry Edison
Gee Baby, Ain't I Good to You (Verve, 1957)

With Roy Eldridge
Rockin' Chair (Clef, 1953)
Dale's Wail (Clef, 1953) 
Little Jazz (Clef, 1954)

With Victor Feldman
Soviet Jazz Themes (Äva, 1962)

With Johnny Frigo
 I Love John Frigo...He Swings (Mercury, 1957)

With Stan Getz
Stan Getz and the Oscar Peterson Trio (Verve, 1958) 
Jazz Giants '58 (Verve, 1958)

With Dizzy Gillespie
Diz and Getz (Norgran, 1953) 
Roy and Diz with Roy Eldridge (Clef, 1954) 
For Musicians Only (Verve, 1956)

With Vince Guaraldi
Alma-Ville (Warner Bros.-Seven Arts, 1969)
It Was a Short Summer, Charlie Brown (Peanuts television special, 1969)
A Boy Named Charlie Brown: Selections from the Film Soundtrack (Columbia Masterworks, 1970)
 A Boy Named Charlie Brown: Original Motion Picture Soundtrack (Kritzerland, 2017)

With Coleman Hawkins
Coleman Hawkins and Confrères (Verve, 1958)

With Illinois Jacquet
Swing's the Thing (Clef, 1956)

With Peggy Lee
 Mink Jazz (Capitol Records, 1963)
 Guitars a là Lee (Capitol Records, 1966)

With Randy Newman
 Randy Newman (Reprise, 1968)

With Oscar Peterson
Oscar Peterson Plays Count Basie (Verve, 1956)
Oscar Peterson at the Stratford Shakespearean Festival (Verve, 1956)
The Oscar Peterson Trio with Sonny Stitt, Roy Eldridge and Jo Jones at Newport (Verve, 1957)
Oscar Peterson at the Concertgebouw (Verve, 1957)
On the Town with the Oscar Peterson Trio (Verve, 1958)
Hello Herbie (MPS, 1969)
Live at the Blue Note (Telarc, 1990)

With Esther Phillips
Confessin' the Blues (Atlantic, 1976)

With Lou Rawls
Lou Rawls Live! (Capitol, 1966)

With Bud Shank
Bud Shank Plays Music from Today's Movies (World Pacific, 1967) 
Magical Mystery (World Pacific, 1967)

With Gábor Szabó
Wind, Sky and Diamonds (Impulse!, 1967)

With Sonny Stitt
Only the Blues (Verve, 1958)

With Ben Webster
Soulville (Verve, 1957)

With Lester Young
Pres and Sweets with Harry Edison (Norgran, 1955) 
Laughin' to Keep from Cryin' (Verve, 1958)

References

External links
 Herb Ellis on the Arkansas Jazz Hall of Fame website
Biography at Classic Jazz Guitar.
Keith Thursby, "Herb Ellis dies at 88; jazz guitarist", Los Angeles Times, March 31, 2010.
Peter Keepnews, "Herb Ellis, Jazz Guitarist, Is Dead at 88", New York Times, March 30, 2010.
 "Herb Ellis" (obituary), Daily Telegraph, April 5, 2010.

1921 births
2010 deaths
20th-century American guitarists
American jazz guitarists
Bebop guitarists
Concord Records artists
Cool jazz guitarists
Deaths from Alzheimer's disease
Deaths from dementia in California
Jazz musicians from California
Mainstream jazz guitarists
People from Farmersville, Texas
Swing guitarists
University of North Texas College of Music alumni
Verve Records artists
West Coast jazz guitarists
Guitarists from California
American male guitarists
Jazz musicians from Texas
20th-century American male musicians
American male jazz musicians
The Capp-Pierce Juggernaut members
The Tonight Show Band members
Dukes of Dixieland members
Great Guitars (band) members
Oscar Peterson Trio members